Jacula was an Italian rock band founded in 1969 in Milan as an experiment by Antonio Bartoccetti, Doris Norton, organist Charles Tiring and medium Franz Porthenzy.

Jacula's music was considered innovative for the time in progressive circles but considered dark and strange by most fans and analysts of the genre, especially in an era that included the development of groups such as Pink Floyd, Genesis and Gentle Giant, bands which were the basis of the new progressive rock scene.

Because the band was experimental, and had been labeled by founder Antonio Bartoccetti as a youth mistake, Jacula's discography is relatively small.

The group completed two albums: In Cauda Semper Stat Venenum, self-released in 1969 through the band's Gnome record label, and Tardo Pede In Magiam Versus which features Fiamma Dello Spirito's vocals, with a sound influenced by bands of the Italian underground scene such as Le Orme. In the 1970s, Jacula changed their name to Antonius Rex, maintaining the same lineup.

After nearly four decades, Jacula released their third studio album Pre Viam in May, 2011.

Discography 
In Cauda Semper Stat Venenum (1969)
Tardo Pede In Magiam Versus (1972)
Pre Viam (2011)

References

External links 
 Antonius Rex & Jacula Official Website

Black Widow Records artists
Italian gothic rock groups
Italian progressive rock groups
Musical groups established in 1968
Musical groups from Milan
Occult rock musical groups